Ernest Tristram Crutchley  (10 February 1878 – 5 October 1940) was a British civil servant who was the predecessor of the first British High Commissioner to Australia.

Career
Crutchley was educated at Emanuel School and joined the Post Office as a "boy clerk" in 1893. In 1909 he was promoted from clerk to Assistant Surveyor 
"upon a special recommendation from the Postmaster-General." During World War I he was appointed to organise the Army postal service and was commissioned in the Royal Engineers with the rank of Captain. He ended the war as an acting Lieutenant colonel and was appointed OBE. After the war he served in the Ministry of Transport 1919–21, then on the staff of the last Chief Secretary for Ireland at Dublin Castle until the establishment of the Irish Free State in 1922. In 1928 he was appointed "British Government Representative for Migration in Australia", and in 1931 he became "Representative in the Commonwealth of Australia of HM Government in the United Kingdom" pending the appointment of the first British High Commissioner to Australia. In 1935 he was recalled by the Post Office to serve as Public Relations Officer, then was Public Relations Officer in the Ministry of Home Security, 1939–40  "to undertake the difficult task of explaining to the public the importance of the new Civil Defence measures." He retired due to ill health shortly before his death.

Crutchley was appointed OBE in 1919 and promoted to CBE in 1926. He was appointed CMG in the 1932 New Year Honours and CB in the 1935 Birthday Honours.

References

CRUTCHLEY, Ernest Tristram, Who Was Who, A & C Black, 1920–2016 (online edition, Oxford University Press, 2014)

External links

1878 births
1940 deaths
People educated at Emanuel School
Civil servants in the General Post Office
British Army personnel of World War I
Royal Engineers officers
Civil servants in Ireland (1801–1922)
Australian colonial governors and administrators
Companions of the Order of the Bath
Companions of the Order of St Michael and St George
British expatriates in Australia